Ibru or IBRU may refer to:

People
 Alex Ibru (1945–2011), Nigerian businessman and publisher
 Cecilia Ibru (born 1946), Nigerian businesswoman
 Felix Ibru (1935–2016), Nigerian architect and politician
 Michael Ibru (1932–2016), Nigerian businessman

Other
 International Boundaries Research Unit, a unit at Durham University
 Ibru Organization, a Nigerian conglomerate
 Ibru, a village in Blandiana Commune, Alba County, Romania